Christopher Christian (born March 27, 1989) is an American soccer player who most recently played as a defender for Oakland Roots SC in the National Independent Soccer Association.

Raised in West Orange, New Jersey, Christian attended West Orange High School.

Career

College and amateur
Christian played four years of college soccer at Villanova University between 2007 and 2010. While at college, Christian also appeared for USL PDL sides New Jersey Rangers and Central Jersey Spartans.

Professional
After time in Poland and Ghana, Christian signed with NASL side Atlanta Silverbacks on March 17, 2015. On August 7, 2015, Christian moved to United Soccer League side Colorado Springs Switchbacks on loan.

On January 25, 2016, Sacramento Republic FC signed Christian while a free agent after his time with Colorado Springs.

On February 15, 2018, Christian signed with San Antonio FC for the 2018 season.

References

1989 births
Living people
American soccer players
Villanova Wildcats men's soccer players
NJ-LUSO Parma players
Central Jersey Spartans players
Atlanta Silverbacks players
Colorado Springs Switchbacks FC players
Sacramento Republic FC players
San Antonio FC players
Oakland Roots SC players
Association football defenders
Soccer players from New Jersey
USL League Two players
North American Soccer League players
National Independent Soccer Association players
Soccer players from New York City
Sportspeople from Essex County, New Jersey
People from West Orange, New Jersey
West Orange High School (New Jersey) alumni